Onnuri Community Church (sometimes stylized OnNuRi Community Church, abbreviated OCC, also called Onnuri, Onnuri Church, and Onnuri Presbyterian Church) is a local church in Seoul, South Korea, founded by Ha Yong-jo (1946–2011).

History 
Ha Yong-jo began Onnuri Church in 1985 with 12 families with a vision of stirring, a vision similar to the Book of Acts. It has since grown to become one of South Korea's largest Presbyterian churches. As one of approximately 25 megachurches in Korea, and is an emerging church, engaging in postmodern modes of evangelism, organizational structure, and leadership.

The main church building and administration housing cost millions of dollars to build and are located in Yongsan District. It currently occupies five different church buildings spread out over Seoul, encompassing congregations speaking ten different languages.

Onnuri English Ministry, spread out over three different church buildings, is the largest English-language Presbyterian ministry in Korea, employing seven part-time pastors and four full-time pastors.

By 2006, 46,000 adults were registered church members, 41,500 of which were in regular attendance of Sunday church services.

Social care 
Onnuri took on much of Handong Global University's debt in the mid-1990s when the university was experiencing financial distress.

References

External links
Official Website 

Churches in Seoul
Presbyterian churches in Seoul
Presbyterian megachurches
20th-century Presbyterian churches
1986 establishments in South Korea
Christian organizations established in 1986
Emerging church movement